Dessie Zuria (Amharic ደሴ ዙሪያ "Greater Dessie Area") is one of the woredas in the Amhara Region of Ethiopia. Located at the eastern edge of the Ethiopian highlands in the Debub Wollo Zone, Dessie Zuria is bordered on the south by Abuko and Were Ilu, on the southwest by Legambo, on the northwest by Tenta, on the north by Kutaber, on the northeast by Tehuledere, and on the east by Kalu. The cities of Kombolcha and Dessie are independent woredas surrounded by Dessie Zuria; the major town in the woreda is Tita.

In 2002, a number of kebeles were taken from Kalu and Dessie Zuria to create the new woreda of Abuko.

Demographics
Based on the 2007 national census conducted by the Central Statistical Agency of Ethiopia (CSA), this woreda has a total population of 157,679, an increase of -21.72% over the 1994 census, of whom 77,626 are men and 80,053 women; - or 0.00% are urban inhabitants. With an area of 937.32 square kilometers, Dessie Zuriya has a population density of 168.22, which is greater than the Zone average of 147.58 persons per square kilometer. A total of 35,437 households were counted in this woreda, resulting in an average of 4.45 persons to a household, and 34,524 housing units. The majority of the inhabitants were Muslim, with 98.51% reporting that as their religion, while 1.39% of the population said they practiced Ethiopian Orthodox Christianity.

The 1994 national census reported a total population for this woreda of 201,433 in 43,294 households, of whom 99,158 were men and 102,275 were women; 2,224 or 1.1% of its population were urban dwellers. The largest ethnic group reported in Dessie Zuria was the Amhara (99.93%). Amharic was spoken as a first language by 99.58%. The majority of the inhabitants were Muslim, with 97.72% of the population having reported they practiced that belief, while 2.21% of the population said they professed Ethiopian Orthodox Christianity.

See also
 Sagarat

Notes

Districts of Amhara Region